Dave Wright (born September 3, 1945) is an American politician who currently serves as a member of the Tennessee House of Representatives. A Republican, Wright is based in Corryton, an unincorporated community in Knox County, and represents the District 19, which consists of the northeastern parts of Knox County.

Background
Dave Wright attended Gibbs High School in Corryton. He attended the University of Tennessee, where he received a Bachelor of Science in business administration. He also attended the U.S. Army Officer Candidate School. He is married to Pat, and has one son, William, and a granddaughter, Ansley. He was a lieutenant in the U.S. Army during the Vietnam War, and worked for AT&T.

Wright was appointed to the Knox County Commission on February 20, 2008, and elected to a partial term the following August. He was elected to the state house in 2018 with 72.61% of the vote.

Electoral History

2016

2018

2020

2022

References

21st-century American politicians
Republican Party members of the Tennessee House of Representatives
People from Knoxville, Tennessee
University of Tennessee alumni
1945 births
Living people